Høgnorsk (meaning High Norwegian), is a term for varieties of the Norwegian language from Nynorsk that reject most of the official reforms that have been introduced since the creation of . Høgnorsk typically accepts the initial reforms that, among other things, removed certain silent letters of etymological origin, while keeping most of the  grammar intact.

Torleiv Hannaas is often credited for introducing the term  in an article in 1922. He used it analogously to High German, pointing out that Ivar Aasen, the creator of Nynorsk orthography, had especially valued the dialects of the mountainous areas of middle and western Norway, as opposed to the dialects of the lowlands of eastern Norway, which Hannaas called  (Flat Norwegian, like ). 

The written High Norwegian language is a tradition originating from the first version of the New Norwegian written language (then called ), as it was built by Ivar Aasen and later used by classical New Norwegian authors as Aasmund Olavsson Vinje, Arne Garborg, Olav Nygard and Olav H. Hauge.

Reforms to this end were carried through in 1938 and 1959. Initially there was considerable resistance against these reforms, but the resulting standard is now widely accepted.  is currently supported by Ivar Aasen-sambandet and the activists behind Målmannen, but has relatively few active users.

The basis for the High Norwegian language direction, is a wish to preserve the New Norwegian written language as an independent language, free of the strong influence from  that today's New Norwegian has.

References

External links 
Articles in Høgnorsk on the Nynorsk edition of Wikipedia
Høgnorskringen, association promoting Høgnorsk.
Mållekken, a Høgnorsk wiki.
Høgnorskportalen sambandet.no, a resource page with hundreds of articles written in Høgnorsk.
Tidskriftet Målmannen, a magazine promoting the Høgnorsk language.
Norsk Formlæra, a høgnorsk grammar.
Norsk Ordlista, a høgnorsk dictionary.

Norwegian orthography
Nynorsk
Linguistic purism